Otog Front Banner is a banner of southwestern Inner Mongolia, People's Republic of China, bordering Ningxia to the southwest and Shaanxi province to the southeast. It is under the administration of Ordos City.

Climate

References

Official site 

Banners of Inner Mongolia
Ordos City